The Chapel of the Charity ( is a Roman Catholic chapel in Villa Nueva, Algeciras, Spain.

History
The Chapel of the Charity was built in 1768 on the Plaza Juan de Lima, attached to the old Charity Hospital. It has a single nave and a facade with a main door flanked by Doric pilasters. A plaque on the door reminds people that it was built by public subscription. During the eighteenth century the chapel was dedicated to the Virgen del Carmen, patron saint of seafarers, due to the proximity of the port at the time. During the assaults of 1931 this chapel was ransacked and although many of the more valuable items were hidden, most of the images were destroyed.

References

Churches in Algeciras
Roman Catholic churches completed in 1768
18th-century Roman Catholic church buildings in Italy
1768 establishments in Spain